John Weiss & Son were London-based surgical instrument makers during the 1700s and 1800s.

Early history
The company was founded in 1787 by John Weiss, an Austrian, whose skill as master cutler and instrument maker were soon widely acknowledged. He received much recognition, including a Royal Warrant for his inventiveness and craftsmanship, being appointed "Razor Makers to the King" by William IV, and many of his instruments bore the Royal Arms on the handles. Weiss, born in 1773 in Rostock and baptised Johann Jacob Daniel Weiss, was the son of Georg Berend Jacob Weiss (1740–1803) and Anna Elisabeth Wamkross. Weiss married Mary Kirby on 5 May 1805 and they had two children Frederick Foveaux Weiss, baptised 10 May 1807, and Mary Weiss, baptised 21 January 1810.

Weiss's father, Georg Berend Jacob Weiss, had served an apprenticeship in the cutlery trade and was admitted as Master Cutler to the Rostock Guild of Smiths in 1765. On moving to London, Weiss began making surgical instruments and in 1795 conducted business under the name of 'White'.

The company's first catalogue was published in 1823 and listed a variety of greatly improved and newly invented instruments. By 1825, the catalogue had grown to 126 pages with detailed accounts of the instruments and recommendations by Benjamin Collins Brodie (1783–1862), Astley Cooper (1768–1841), Everard Home (1756–1832) and other notable surgeons. The catalogue also displayed a patented gastric pump described as a 'syringe for the extracting of poisons from the stomach'. The gastric pump was widely used in the first half of the 1800s and was acclaimed as a major development in the field.

In 1826, Weiss visited relatives in Rostock and donated a collection of his instruments to the Rostock Town Council, together with a catalogue and gastric pump, all packed into two mahogany cases. The Rostock Council record of 25 August 1826 described Weiss as "the famous manufacturer" and resolved to designate him an honorary Freeman of Rostock.

Weiss applied for British citizenship on 26 June 1826, having lived in England for some 31 years. He was granted the equivalent of 'permanent resident status' by King George IV on 11 October 1826, and later appointed 'Razor Maker to the King' under William IV. Weiss stamped the Royal Arms on many of the handles of his surgical instruments. Weiss' 1831 catalogue listed a novel limb saw designed to prevent clogging when amputating, and four types of spring fleam, part of his range of veterinary instruments. Weiss was a pioneer in producing veterinary instruments after the first veterinary colleges were established in London and Edinburgh. His son, Frederick Foveaux Weiss joined the company in 1831, which then became John Weiss & Son. On Weiss' death his considerable fortune took care of the needs of his widow, son, daughter, sister, stepsister, porter and coachman. Frederick Foveaux Weiss then took over management of the company.

Weiss' original premises were at 42 Strand, London, and by 1836 at 62 Strand. By 1841 the business was styled John Weiss & Son, with Richard Williams being recorded as a partner. Another partnership of Frederick Foveaux Weiss, Alfred Markes, Henry Joseph Francis Hubert Foveaux, and Richard Williams dissolved in 1868–9, possibly because of Richard Williams' retirement or death. Markes and Foveaux both withdrew from the firm on 31 December 1871. Under the Patent Law Amendment Act of 1852, The London Gazette of March 15, 1861 page 1201, records "502. To Henry Joseph Francis Hubert Foveaux, of the Strand, in the city of Westminster, Surgical Instrument Manufacturer for the invention of improvements in specula, and in plugs used in connection therewith.", and again on January 19, 1872, page 205, "74. To Henry Joseph Francis Hubert Foveaux, of No. 62, Strand, in the county of Middlesex, Surgical Instrument Maker, for the invention of improvements in scissors."

The business in 1885, seemingly managed by Frederick Foveaux Weiss, moved to 287 Oxford Street in London and to 42 King Street in Manchester. In the 1980s the company's addresses were given as 11 Wigmore Street and 74 Banner Street, London.

Death
Weiss had a morbid fear of being buried alive, and to guard against this eventuality fashioned an instrument to penetrate his heart when the coffin was closed. Detailed instructions to this end were left in his will. John Weiss died on 26 December 1843 and was buried in the churchyard of St Nicholas' Church, Brighton with his surgeon Benjamin Vallance in attendance to carry out his wishes. Frederick's brother, the skin surgeon, Hubert Foveaux Weiss, died in 1892.

Today
The firm still operates under the name John Weiss & Son Ltd. and was based at Milton Keynes, but now based in Harlow Essex, forming part of the Haag-Streit Group of companies.

In popular culture
In 1888, Weiss surgical knives were used by the serial killer, Jack the Ripper. Earlier, in 1882, they were the silent weapons of choice for the Phoenix Park Murders in Dublin.

In "The Adventure of Silver Blaze" (1892), one of Arthur Conan Doyle's Sherlock Holmes stories, a knife found on the crime scene is a surgical instrument marked Weiss & Co., London.

References

Surgical instrument manufacturers
Defunct companies based in London